Consolas is a monospaced typeface designed by Luc(as) de Groot. It is a part of the ClearType Font Collection, a suite of fonts that take advantage of Microsoft's ClearType font rendering technology. It has been included with Windows since Windows Vista, Microsoft Office 2007 and Microsoft Visual Studio 2010, and is available for download from Microsoft. It is the only standard Windows Vista font with a slash through the zero character. It is the default font for Microsoft Notepad as of Windows 8.

Characteristics
Consolas supports the following OpenType layout features: stylistic alternates, localized forms, uppercase-sensitive forms, oldstyle figures, lining figures, arbitrary fractions, superscript, subscript.

Although Consolas is designed as a replacement for Courier New, only 713 glyphs were initially available, as compared to Courier New (2.90)'s 1318 glyphs. In version 5.22 (included with Windows 7), support for Greek Extended, Combining Diacritical Marks For Symbols, Number Forms, Arrows, Box Drawing, and Geometric Shapes was added. In version 5.32 the total number of supported glyphs was 2735. In version 7.00 (as part of Windows 10 1909) there are 3030 glyphs in total.

Availability
This font, along with Calibri, Cambria, Candara, Corbel and Constantia, is also distributed with Microsoft Excel Viewer, Microsoft PowerPoint Viewer, the Microsoft Office Compatibility Pack for Microsoft Windows and the Open XML File Format Converter for Mac.

Consolas is also available for licensing from Ascender Corporation.

Bare Bones Software has licensed the font from Ascender for use in their text editor BBEdit.

Alternatives 
 Inconsolata, an open source font inspired by Consolas, is available on Google Fonts.

See also 
 Cascadia Code

References

External links

Microsoft Typography page
 

Monospaced typefaces
Windows Vista typefaces
Typefaces and fonts introduced in 2006
Typefaces designed by Luc(as) de Groot
ClearType Font Collection
IPA typefaces